Gorytvesica sychnopina is a species of moth of the family Tortricidae. It is found in Ecuador in the provinces of Napo, Tungurahua and Morona-Santiago.

The wingspan is 16–18 mm for males and 19–20 mm for females. The forewings are rusty, strigulated (finely streaked) with brown and suffused with dark brown near two white lines. The hindwings are creamy grey, strigulated with brownish grey.

Etymology
The species name refers to the great number of cornuti and is derived from Greek sychnos (meaning plentiful) and  Latin spina (meaning spine).

References

Moths described in 2005
Euliini
Moths of South America
Taxa named by Józef Razowski